Magnus Kristoffer Andersen (20 March 1916 in Andøy – 11 December 1994) was a Norwegian politician for the Labour Party. He served as Minister of Fisheries from 1963 to 1965 and again from January to October 1972. He was also an MP for Nordland from 1965 to 1973. 

Andersen worked as a fisher until 1955, when he became chairman of Norges Fiskarlag (Union of Norwegian Fishers), where he had been a member of the board since 1951. He served as chairman of the organisation until 1963. This year Andersen became Minister of Fisheries in the fourth cabinet Gerhardsen (25 September 1963 - 12 October 1965).  He served again in the same position in the first cabinet Bratteli from 24 January 1972, upon the resignation of Knut Hoem, until the dissolution of the government on 18 October.

After this he sat two periods in the Norwegian Parliament for Nordland.  In the first period he was a member of the expanded Foreign Affairs and Constitutional Committee, and vice-chairman of the Shipping and Fishery Committee.  In the second period he was vice-chairman of Fullmaktskomiteen (the Plenipotentiary Committee), in addition to serving on the same committees as in the last period.

Andersen also served on a number of different boards of directors throughout a long political career. Amongst other things he was chairman of the board of the Norwegian Postal Service from 1974 to 1982. In local politics, he served one term in the executive committee of Bø municipality council from 1951 to 1955.

References 

1916 births
1994 deaths
Labour Party (Norway) politicians
Members of the Storting
Government ministers of Norway
Nordland politicians
20th-century Norwegian politicians
People from Andøy